Hoi Bun is one of the 19 constituencies in the Tsuen Wan District of Hong Kong which was created in 1991.

The constituency loosely covers Riviera Gardens in Tsuen Wan with the estimated population of 18,556.

Councillors represented

Election results

2010s

2000s

1990s

References

Constituencies of Hong Kong
1991 in Hong Kong
Constituencies of Tsuen Wan District Council
1991 establishments in Hong Kong
Constituencies established in 1991
Tsuen Wan